During 1996, tropical cyclones formed within seven different tropical cyclone basins, located within various parts of the Atlantic, Pacific, and Indian Oceans. Fran and Herb are the costliest storm of the year, both with a damage cost of $5 billion as they both affected landmasses. The deadliest tropical cyclone of the year was the 1996 Andhra Pradesh cyclone, which was blamed for over 1,000 fatalities as it directly affected the state of Andhra Pradesh in India. Five Category 5 tropical cyclones were formed in 1996.

Global atmospheric and hydrological conditions
The weak La Niña prevailed until the end of the year, which made the waters of the Pacific and Atlantic oceans warmer than usual. Despite the fact that the 1995–96 La Niña was not a powerful occurrence, it recharged much of the ocean heat released from nearly two decades of El Niño events.

Summary

North Atlantic Ocean 

An average Atlantic hurricane season features 12 tropical storms, 6 hurricanes, and 3 major hurricanes, and features an Accumulated Cyclone Energy (ACE) count of 106. In the season, all of them were reached, featuring 13 tropical storms, 9 hurricanes, and 6 major hurricanes, with an ACE total of 166. A rare subtropical storm also formed in mid-September, that affected the Northeastern United States and the nearby Eastern Canada.

The season had the most major hurricanes since 1950 and the season's first tropical cyclone, Tropical Storm Arthur, developed on June 17, while the final cyclone, Hurricane Marco dissipated on November 26. The most intense hurricane, Edouard, was a powerful Cape Verde-type hurricane that affected portions of the Mid-Atlantic states and New England. The season featured nine tropical cyclone landfalls, including six hurricanes, one of which was a major hurricane.

The four most notable tropical cyclones of the season were hurricanes Bertha, Cesar, Fran, and Hortense. Bertha made landfall as a Category 2 hurricane on the coast of North Carolina, causing a total of 12 deaths and $335 million (1996 USD) in damage. Hurricane Fran made landfall in the same general area a little over a month later as a Category 3 hurricane, causing 37 deaths and $5 billion in damage. Hurricane Cesar developed in the east Caribbean during late-July and crossed Nicaragua into the eastern Pacific as a strong tropical storm several days later, at which time it earned the name Douglas. The system produced strong winds and flooding, leading to 113 deaths and $202.96 million in damage. Finally, Hurricane Hortense formed in the eastern Atlantic during the month of September and crossed Hispaniola and Puerto Rico, causing 39 direct deaths and $158 million in damage. Collectively, the tropical cyclones of the 1996 Atlantic hurricane season caused $6.52 billion in damage and 256 deaths.

Eastern and Central Pacific Ocean 

An average Pacific hurricane season features 15 tropical storms, 9 hurricanes, and 4 major hurricanes, and features an Accumulated Cyclone Energy (ACE) count of 132. In the season, the statistics fell below the average list, with 9 tropical storms, 5 hurricanes, and 2 major hurricanes.

It was a below-average season; however, it recorded a four Pacific hurricanes striking Mexico. In addition, one Atlantic hurricane, Hurricane Cesar, crossed into this zone from the Atlantic Ocean and was renamed Douglas. None of the systems in the eastern north Pacific crossed 140°W and entered the central Pacific. The last time that happened was in the 1979 season.

In the central north Pacific, one tropical depression formed. In addition, a depression crossed the dateline from the western Pacific before dissipating in this basin. None of these two systems reached tropical storm strength. In addition, data from the Joint Typhoon Warning Center, on September 1, Tropical Depression Rick crossed the International Date Line, entering into CPHC's area of responsibility; however, this storm was not included into CPHC database. The storm eventually became extratropical on September 3 over open waters.

In terms of the number of storms, the season was below average. Despite this, there were a large number of landfalls. Of note is the fact that three tropical cyclones approached close to, or made landfall on, Mexico during a ten-day span from June 23 to July 3. In all, a record-setting four hurricanes (Alma, Boris, Fausto, and Hernan) struck the coastline.

Western Pacific Ocean 

The average typhoon season lasts year-round, with the majority of the storms forming between May and October. An average Pacific typhoon season features 26 tropical storms, 16 typhoons, and 9 super typhoons (unofficial category). It also features an average Accumulated Cyclone Energy (ACE) count of approximately 294; the basin is typically the most active basin for tropical cyclone formation. The statistics were reached, except the number of super typhoons, which fell below the list. The season featured 30 tropical storms, 16 typhoons, and 6 super typhoons. The first tropical depression formed on January 12 and the last storm dissipated on December 27.

The strongest and the deadliest typhoon of the year was Typhoon Herb, which also became the largest, and the fourth-wettest tropical cyclone to affect Taiwan. It killed over 284 people and left $5 billion worth of damages as it affected the Ryukyu Islands, Taiwan, and China as a super typhoon. Frankie left 104 deaths as it passed near Vietnam. Marty formed over southern China and resulted in the deaths of 125 people as it affected the same country.

During most of the year, sea surface temperatures were moderately below normal near the equator, and were highest around 160° E from August to October, due to the prevailing La Niña. Overall, there were 30 named storms in the basin in 1996, which was slightly above the norm of 27. A total of 15 of the 30 storms became typhoons.

North Indian Ocean 

The 1996 North Indian Ocean cyclone season featured several deadly tropical cyclones, with over 2,000 people killed during the year. It was a slightly average season, featuring nine tropical cyclones, five cyclonic storms, four severe cyclonic storms, two very severe cyclonic storms; however, it has no super cyclonic storm.

The first system originated on May 7 in the Bay of Bengal, which is the body of water east of India; the storm developed in tandem with a storm in the southern hemisphere, and ultimately struck Bangladesh. Three storms formed in June. The first struck Oman and later caused devastating flooding in Yemen, killing 338 people and causing $1.2 billion in damage. The other two storms struck opposite sides of India, collectively resulting in 226 deaths after causing widespread flooding. After a brief land depression in July and a weak depression in early October, the season featured four notable cyclones beginning in late October. A low-pressure area moved across southern India, killing 388 people before taking an unusual track in the Arabian Sea. At the end of October, a deep depression killed 14 people in Bangladesh. The strongest cyclone of the season was also the deadliest, killing 1,077 people when it struck Andhra Pradesh in early November. The final storm of the season executed a rare loop in the Bay of Bengal before weakening and striking southern India in early December, killing seven.

South-West Indian Ocean

January–June 

The 1995–96 South-West Indian Ocean cyclone season was a moderately active season that included Cyclone Bonita, which was the first known tropical cyclone to cross from the southern Indian Ocean into the southern Atlantic Ocean. The tropical activity lasted for about six months from the middle of November 1995 to early May 1996. The first storm, Intense Tropical Cyclone Agnielle, formed in the adjacent Australian basin on November 16 and later reached peak winds in the south-west Indian Ocean. The next named storm after Agnielle was Bonita, which formed in early January and killed 42 people. The basin was most active in February, with two tropical cyclones, or the equivalent of a minimal hurricane, as well as a severe tropical storm. The first of these three was Doloresse, which killed 67 people due to a shipwreck in the Comoros. The next storm was Cyclone Edwige, which caused heavy crop damage on Mauritius before looping along the east coast of Madagascar. In March, both Cyclone Flossy and Tropical Storm Guylianne passed near the Mascarene Islands, producing heavy rainfall and gusty winds.

Tropical activity continued through April and May, with two tropical cyclones in the former month. In early April, Tropical Cyclone Hansella moved over the island of Rodrigues, dropping more rainfall in 24 hours than the average monthly total. Later, Itelle became a rare April intense tropical cyclone but weakened before it approached St. Brandon island. The final storm of the season, Jenna, formed in the Australian region, briefly intensified into a minimal tropical storm in the south-west Indian Ocean, and proceeded to exit the basin on May 4 to end the season. In addition to the named storms, several tropical depressions were tracked, one of which in December dropped heavy rainfall on Réunion.

July–December 

On August 16, a tropical disturbance started the season, an unusual start. It remained below tropical depression intensity before dissipating on August 19. Not a month later, on September 6, a tropical disturbance formed from a trough near the Chagos Archipelago, with the MFR classifying the system as Tropical Disturbance A2. Located in an unfavourable environment, the storm possessed gale-force winds before dissipating on September 10. Antoinette formed on October 10, passing near the northern Madagascar before weakening. Bellamine and Chantelle developed in the month of November, with the former crossing the basin from the Australian region as Tropical Cyclone Melanie before it was renamed. Daniella and Evrina formed in the month of December, with the latter becoming the strongest tropical cyclone of the year.

Australian region

January–June 

The 1995–96 Australian region cyclone season was an active Australian cyclone season, with Western Australia experiencing a record number of landfalling intense storms in the Pilbara region. The season produced a total of 19 tropical cyclones, of which 14 developed into named storms and 9 reached severe tropical cyclone status. Though several systems impacted land, the general sparsity of population centres in Australia limits the scale of damage. One person was confirmed to have been killed and cumulative losses were estimated at A$77 million (US$58.5 million).

July–December 

On July 9, a tropical low formed near the Cocos Islands, starting the season. It soon strengthened to Tropical Cyclone Lindsay before weakening and dissipating on July 13. Three months later, Cyclone Melanie formed near the Cocos (Keeling) Islands before crossing into the nearby South-West Indian Ocean basin, where it was renamed Bellamine. Nicholas, Ophelia, Fergus and Phil all developed on the month of December.

South Pacific Ocean

January–June 

The 1995–96 South Pacific cyclone season was one of the least active South Pacific tropical cyclone season's on record, with only four tropical cyclones occurring within the South Pacific Ocean to the east of 160°E.

The first storm developed on January 12, while the last one dissipated on April 2. After the season ended Beti's name was the only name to be retired from the tropical cyclone naming lists and was replaced with Bune, after it inflicted over US$5.6 million worth of damage to Australia, Vanuatu, New Caledonia, and New Zealand.

July–December 

Cyril started the season as a tropical low on November 23. It soon strikes New Caledonia, causing unknown damage. Fergus from the adjacent Australian region entered the basin on December 20, with the cyclone rapidly intensifying to a Category 3 severe tropical cyclone before dissipating on December 30.

South Atlantic Ocean 

According to the Zambia Meteorological Department, Cyclone Bonita moved off the coast of Angola and entered the South Atlantic Ocean on January 19, 1996. By the next day, the system had succumbed to cold waters and days of land interaction, dissipating completely. It was the first tropical cyclone known to have traversed southern Africa from the South-West Indian Ocean to the South Atlantic.

Mediterranean Sea 

Three notable medicanes developed in the month of September. The first, in mid-September 1996, was a typical Mediterranean tropical cyclone that developed in the Balearic Islands region. At the time of the cyclone's formation, a powerful Atlantic cold front and a warm front associated with a large-scale low, producing northeasterly winds over the Iberian peninsula, extended eastward into the Mediterranean, while abundant moisture gathered in the lower troposphere over the Balearic channel. On the morning of 12 September, a disturbance developed off of Valencia, Spain, dropping heavy rainfall on the coast even without coming ashore. An eye developed shortly thereafter as the system rapidly traversed across Majorca and Sardinia in its eastward trek.

The second of the three recorded Mediterranean tropical cyclones in 1996 formed between Sicily and Tunisia on 4 October, making landfall on both Sicily and southern Italy. The medicane generated major flooding in Sicily.

The third major Mediterranean tropical cyclone of that year formed north of Algeria, and strengthened while sweeping between the Balearic Islands and Sardinia, with an eye-like feature prominent on satellite. The storm was unofficially named Cornelia. The eye of the storm was distorted and disappeared after transiting over southern Sardinia throughout the evening of 8 October, with the system weakening as a whole. Extreme damage was reported in the Aeolian Islands after the tropical cyclone passed north of Sicily, though the system dissipated while turning southward over Calabria. Both October systems featured distinctive spiral bands, intense convection, high sustained winds, and abundant precipitation.

A medicane was observed from 10 to 13 December.

Systems

January

February

March

April

May

June

July

August

September

October

November

December

Global effects
There are a total of 9 tropical cyclone basins, 7 are seasonal and two are non-seasonal, thus all 8 basins except the Mediterranean are active. In this table, data from all these basins are added.

See also

 Tropical cyclones by year
 List of earthquakes in 1996
 Tornadoes of 1996

Notes
2 Only systems that formed either on or after January 1, 1996 are counted in the seasonal totals.
3 Only systems that formed either before or on December 31, 1996 are counted in the seasonal totals.4 The wind speeds for this tropical cyclone/basin are based on the IMD Scale which uses 3-minute sustained winds.
5 The wind speeds for this tropical cyclone/basin are based on the Saffir Simpson Scale which uses 1-minute sustained winds.
6The wind speeds for this tropical cyclone are based on Météo-France which uses wind gusts.

References

External links

Regional Specialized Meteorological Centers
 US National Hurricane Center – North Atlantic, Eastern Pacific
 Central Pacific Hurricane Center – Central Pacific
 Japan Meteorological Agency – NW Pacific
 India Meteorological Department – Bay of Bengal and the Arabian Sea
 Météo-France – La Reunion – South Indian Ocean from 30°E to 90°E
 Fiji Meteorological Service – South Pacific west of 160°E, north of 25° S

Tropical Cyclone Warning Centers
 Meteorology, Climatology, and Geophysical Agency of Indonesia – South Indian Ocean from 90°E to 141°E, generally north of 10°S
 Australian Bureau of Meteorology (TCWC's Perth, Darwin & Brisbane) – South Indian Ocean & South Pacific Ocean from 90°E to 160°E, generally south of 10°S
 Papua New Guinea National Weather Service – South Pacific Ocean from 141°E to 160°E, generally north of 10°S
 Meteorological Service of New Zealand Limited – South Pacific west of 160°E, south of 25°S

Tropical cyclones by year
1996 Atlantic hurricane season
1996 Pacific hurricane season
1996 Pacific typhoon season
1996 North Indian Ocean cyclone season
1995–96 Australian region cyclone season
1996–97 Australian region cyclone season
1995–96 South Pacific cyclone season
1996–97 South Pacific cyclone season
1995–96 South-West Indian Ocean cyclone season
1996–97 South-West Indian Ocean cyclone season
1996-related lists